Sandholme is a hamlet in the East Riding of Yorkshire, England. It lies just to the north of the M62 motorway.

It forms part of the civil parish of Gilberdyke.
It was previously served by a railway station on the Hull and Barnsley Line before it was decommissioned in 1955. The station house stood until 2012, when it was demolished after being destroyed by fire.

References

Villages in the East Riding of Yorkshire